Carenero is a barrio in the municipality of Guánica, Puerto Rico. Its population in 2010 was 2,670.

Features
The Guánica State Forest is partly located in Carenero.

Gallery

See also

 List of communities in Puerto Rico

References

External links

Barrios of Guánica, Puerto Rico